George Nagy (born July 9, 1957) is a Canadian former competition swimmer who specialized in the butterfly events during the 1970s and early 1980s.  He competed at the 1976 Summer Olympics and was supposed to represent Canada at the 1980 Summer Olympics, but did not participate due to the international boycott of the Moscow Games.  Nagy won a gold medal in the men's 200-metre butterfly at the 1978 Commonwealth Games, and a silver medal in the same event at the 1979 Pan American Games.

Born to a Jewish family in North York, Toronto, he mainly grew up in Manitoba before returning to his birthplace.

See also 
 List of Commonwealth Games medallists in swimming (men)

References 
Canadian Olympic Committee

1957 births
Living people
Canadian male butterfly swimmers
Olympic swimmers of Canada
Sportspeople from North York
Swimmers from Toronto
Swimmers at the 1976 Summer Olympics
Swimmers at the 1978 Commonwealth Games
Swimmers at the 1979 Pan American Games
Commonwealth Games medallists in swimming
Pan American Games silver medalists for Canada
Commonwealth Games gold medallists for Canada
Pan American Games medalists in swimming
Medalists at the 1979 Pan American Games
Medallists at the 1978 Commonwealth Games